Nadieżda Zięba (née: Kostiuczyk; born 21 May 1984) is a Polish retired badminton player of Belarusian origin. She won the mixed doubles gold medal at the 2012 European Championships. Zięba was three times mixed doubles quarter finalists in the badminton at the Summer Olympics.

Career 
Kostiuczyk played the 2007 BWF World Championships in mixed doubles with Robert Mateusiak. They were defeated in quarterfinals by Zheng Bo and Gao Ling of China, 16–21, 17–21. She also played women's doubles with Kamila Augustyn and lost in the first round. They won the silver medal at the 2008 European Championships. At the Belarusian National Badminton Championships she won 7 titles.

Achievements

European Championships 
Mixed doubles

European Junior Championships 
Girls' doubles

BWF Superseries 
The BWF Superseries, which was launched on 14 December 2006 and implemented in 2007, was a series of elite badminton tournaments, sanctioned by the Badminton World Federation (BWF). BWF Superseries levels were Superseries and Superseries Premier. A season of Superseries consisted of twelve tournaments around the world that had been introduced since 2011. Successful players were invited to the Superseries Finals, which were held at the end of each year.

Mixed doubles

  BWF Superseries Finals tournament
  BWF Superseries Premier tournament
  BWF Superseries tournament

BWF Grand Prix 
The BWF Grand Prix had two levels, the Grand Prix and Grand Prix Gold. It was a series of badminton tournaments sanctioned by the Badminton World Federation (BWF) and played between 2007 and 2017. The World Badminton Grand Prix was sanctioned by the International Badminton Federation from 1983 to 2006.

Women's doubles

Mixed doubles

  BWF Grand Prix Gold tournament
  BWF & IBF Grand Prix tournament

BWF International Challenge/Series 
Women's singles

Women's doubles

Mixed doubles

  BWF International Challenge tournament
  BWF International Series tournament
  BWF Future Series tournament

Record against selected opponents 
Mixed doubles results with Robert Mateusiak against year-end Finals finalists, World Championships semi-finalists, and Olympic quarter-finalists.

References

External links 
 BWF Player Profile

1984 births
Living people
Sportspeople from Brest, Belarus
Belarusian female badminton players
Belarusian emigrants to Poland
Naturalized citizens of Poland
Polish female badminton players
Badminton players at the 2008 Summer Olympics
Badminton players at the 2012 Summer Olympics
Badminton players at the 2016 Summer Olympics
Olympic badminton players of Poland
World No. 1 badminton players